The Great South Run is an annual 10 mile (16.09 km) road running race which takes place in Portsmouth, United Kingdom providing an intermediate distance between the ten kilometre and the half marathon (21.097 km) runs. Launched in 1990, it is part of the Great Run series created by former British athlete Brendan Foster. It was originally held in Southampton, but the race moved to its current course after the first edition.

The Great South Run has become one of Europe's most popular mass participation races over 10 miles, with a record 21,000 entries for the 2009 race. Although the elite race is an IAAF Gold Label Road Race which attracts some of the most successful professional runners, it is not a recognised distance for purposes of IAAF records. World record holder Paula Radcliffe and 2007 World Champion Luke Kibet are among the past winners. The event currently has no sponsor. Previous sponsors were ExpressTest by Cignpost (2021), Simplyhealth (2017-2019), Morrisons (2015), Bupa (1993–2014) and Diet Coke (1990–1992). The 2016 race didn't have a major sponsor.

The 1999 edition of the race was selected to be the Amateur Athletic Association 10-mile championships that year. In 2021, British runner Eilish McColgan set the current women's record of 50:42.  Paula Radcliffe won the women's race in 2008 in a time of 51 minutes 11 seconds, a new British record. Kenyan runner Joseph Ebuya won the 2010 edition in 45:15 minutes, which was a significant improvement upon the previous UK all-comers record held by the 1995 winner Benson Masya.

Channel 5 broadcast the Great South Run every year until 2019. The event is currently untelevised.

Past winners

Key:

References 
General
British Road Race Championships – Great South Run winners. GBR Athletics. Retrieved on 2009-10-25.
Martin, Dave (2006-10-22). Pavey bounces back with Great South Run victory. IAAF. Retrieved on 2009-10-25.
Martin, Dave (2009-10-25). Farah scores tremendous victory while Monteiro destroys opposition in Portsmouth. IAAF. Retrieved on 2009-10-25.
Specific

External links 
Official Great Run website

10-mile runs
Sport in Portsmouth
Athletics competitions in England
Recurring sporting events established in 1990
1990 establishments in England
Annual sporting events in the United Kingdom
Annual events in England